Robert Lloyd George MacPhail,  (March 22, 1920 – July 2, 1995) was a Canadian politician and the 23rd Lieutenant Governor of Prince Edward Island.

Born in New Haven, Prince Edward Island, the son of Robert Archibald MacPhail and Catherine C. MacLean, he was first elected in a 1961 by-election to the Legislative Assembly of Prince Edward Island as the Prince Edward Island Progressive Conservative Party candidate in the district of 2nd Queens. He was re-elected in 1962, 1966, 1970, 1974, 1978, 1979 and 1982. He held many cabinet positions including: Minister of Industry and Natural Resources and of Tourism Development (1965–1966), Minister of Finance (1979–1981), Chairman of the Treasury Board (1979–1981), and Minister of Development (1979–1980). He was Lieutenant Governor from 1985 to 1990.

In 1994, he was made a Member of the Order of Canada.

Arms

References

 

1920 births
1995 deaths
People from Queens County, Prince Edward Island
Canadian Baptists
Lieutenant Governors of Prince Edward Island
Members of the Order of Canada
Progressive Conservative Party of Prince Edward Island MLAs
Members of the Executive Council of Prince Edward Island
20th-century Baptists